Web-based VoIP is the integration of voice over IP technologies into the facilities and methodologies of the World-Wide Web. It enables digital communication sessions between Web users, or to users of traditional telecommunication services.

Instead of using dedicated, hardware-based VoIP devices, such as IP phones, analog telephone adapters, or integrated VoIP/Internet access routers, services are provided via a web page and the facilities of the user's computer or hand-held device for accessing and operating a locally attached head set, and microphone.  This is assisted by various software components such as Flash, Active X, Silverlight, Java applet or browser plugins like NPAPI.

Using click-to-call, for example, a  web user may click on a telephone number, or some other suitable icon, embedded in a corporate web site to initiate a web-based telephone call with a customer service representative without leaving the web site or using any other addition telephony equipment.

Applications
 Retail customer service
 Person-to-person VoIP calls (possibly using a lookup like ENUM, or integration with services like Skype)
 Web conferences
 E-learning
 Social networking

Protocols
 SIP
 XMPP
 WebRTC
 Other standards based such as H.323
 Proprietary such as Skype

See also
Cloud communications

References
 WebRTC RFC

Voice over IP